Chung Jong-kwan (born November 30, 1961 in South Korea) is a retired South Korean boxer.

Professional career

Chung turned professional in 1981 and had an auspicious start to his career going 5-8-2 in his first 15 fights. On December 20, 1985, he boxed against Kwon Soon-chun for the third time after two previous bouts that ended in draws, Chung won the fight by 4th round stoppage and was crowned the IBF world flyweight champion. It would however prove to be short reign as Chung would gon to lose the title in his first defense to Chung Bi-won in April of the following year via majority decision, in 1989 he retired from boxing.

See also
List of flyweight boxing champions

External links

1961 births
Living people
South Korean male boxers
Flyweight boxers
Super-flyweight boxers
World flyweight boxing champions
International Boxing Federation champions